Malangas Institute (MI) is a four-year private high school in Malangas, Zamboanga Sibugay, Philippines. MI is the only privately owned high school institution in Malangas. It serves all private high school students in the area. Students from some barangays attended MI as part of their Secondary Education.

High schools in the Philippines
Private schools in the Philippines
Schools in Zamboanga Sibugay
Educational institutions established in 1952
1952 establishments in the Philippines